Maxim Sergeyevich Spesivtsev (born 8 April 1994) is a Russian sprint canoeist.

He won a medal at the 2019 ICF Canoe Sprint World Championships.

References

External links
Profile on infosport.ru

1994 births
Living people
ICF Canoe Sprint World Championships medalists in kayak
Russian male canoeists
Universiade medalists in canoeing
Universiade gold medalists for Russia
Medalists at the 2013 Summer Universiade
Canoeists at the 2020 Summer Olympics
Olympic canoeists of Russia
European Games competitors for Russia
Canoeists at the 2019 European Games